Arrojadoa is a genus of cacti, comprising 6 species and several varieties. It is named after the Brazilian botanist Miguel Arrojado Lisboa (1872–1932) who was superintendent of the Brazilian Railways at the time that Britton and Rose described the genus in 1920. The genus occurs only in northern Brazil and is found at rocky places, under shrubs, which support their frail stalk. They are subtropical plants, with very little frost tolerance.

Description
The species often have frail stalks that can be upright or procumbent, reaching 2 m high and about 2 to 5 cm thick. There are from 10 to 15 ribs, and ramifications are rare, and usually occur from the base.

The flowers are nocturnal and tube-like, measuring 1 to 3 cm in length and 0.5 to 1 cm in diameter. Flower colors can be pink or carmine. The fruit is berry-like, spherical with a maximal diameter of 1.5 cm, and pink or red when ripe.

Species

Cultivation

These tropical cacti are ideal for hanging baskets because of their snake like growth, but they are difficult to cultivate. They grow relatively rapidly in good conditions. Propagation is done more by seed than by cuttings. It grows best on slightly humid soil and with plenty of watering from spring to autumn. In winter it should be left without water and at a minimal temperature of 10 °C.

References

External links
 
 
 https://web.archive.org/web/20120602032609/http://www.columnar-cacti.org/arrojadoa/index.html
 http://www.cactiguide.com/cactus/?genus=Arrojadoa

Cactoideae
Cactoideae genera
Cacti of South America
Endemic flora of Brazil